Prego is a 2015 independent short comedy film directed, written and produced by Usher Morgan, with the help of Seinfeld writer Andy Cowan - the film was released to the internet on December 21, 2015 after a 9 months festival run. The film stars Katie Vincent, Taso Mikroulis, Rachel Jayne, J.W. Harvey and Marah Vanbeekom.

Plot 
Prego offers a humorous take on unplanned pregnancies, it follows the story of Emily (played by Katie Vincent), a young woman confronting a one-night stand (played by Taso Mikroulis) with the revelation that she's pregnant. Things go from bad to worse as she comes to grips with the realization that the man may not be a suited father figure to her unborn child.

Translations 
Prego was translated and dubbed into numerous languages, including Italian, Czech, Russian, Greek and Mandarin.

Critical reception and reviews 
The film gained national recognition and received positive reviews. It won the Best Comedy Short Award at the 2015 Manhattan Film Festival, Best Comedy Short Award at the 2015 Chain NYC Film Festival, 2 awards from the 2015  Indie Fest Film Festival, and the Best Comedy award at the 2015 Trinity International Film Festival. In total the film received 6 wins and 12 nominations. Carl Burgess with ScreenCritix gave the film a positive review: "Prego may only be a two-hander in one location (except for a brief flashback), but the short never becomes boring. This is in thanks to the sharp, funny script and the two great performances from Katie Vincent and Taso Mikroulis. Vincent plays the role of Katie superbly, and Mikroulis’ portrays Mark great as bumbling idiot." Nicholas La Salla with Forest city short film review gave the short a 3.4/5 and mentioned: "Though the storyline has a "been there, done that" feel (most notably in the big budget Knocked Up), the aforementioned fork in the plot toward the end made up for a lot.  The jokes are by and large funny and the characters play off each other in humorous ways."

Awards and nominations

References

External links 
 IMDb – Prego
 Official Facebook Page
 Prego - Short Film
 Prego - Behind the Scenes

2015 short films
American independent films
American short films
2010s English-language films
2010s American films